ESDL may stand for:

 EPOC SDL, a port of the programming library SDL to Symbian OS.
 Erlang SDL, a port of SDL to the Erlang programming language.